After the succession of setbacks the Abdalis of Herat had faced in the campaign Allahyar Khan decided to sully out for a last engagement to decide the issue. Unfortunately yet again the charge of the Afghan horsemen was broken up by the disciplined fire of the Persian line musketeers and flank attacks by the supporting Persian cavalry. Allahyar Khan was left no choice but to withdraw his battered army behind the walls of Herat in the hopes of withstanding the coming siege. An intense bombardment of the city ensued with heavy cannon and mortars battering the city's defences. After consulting with his advisers Allahyar Khan was convinced of the futility of further resistance. Peace terms were offered and the Abdalis agreed to sear fealty to Tahmasp II as the rightful ruler of Persia and Herat. Thus the Abdalis were brought under Persian suzerainty.

See also
 Herat Campaign of 1731
 Herat

Sources
 Michael Axworthy, The Sword of Persia: Nader Shah, from Tribal Warrior to Conquering Tyrant Hardcover 348 pages (26 July 2006) Publisher: I.B. Tauris  Language: English 

Herat 1729
1729 in Afghanistan
Herat 1729
Kafer Qal'eh
History of Kandahar Province